Irakli Chogovadze ( born August 19, 1973) is a Georgian politician. He served as the Minister of Economy of Georgia from 2005 until November 2006. Then  he was head of the Georgian Oil and Gas Corporation.

He was born in Tbilisi. In 1990 he graduated at Tbilisi State University's faculty of finances and credits. In 1991 he took a master's exam in management of bank-financial organizations at the University of Paris.

In 1996 he started working for the European Bank for Reconstruction and Development (EBRD) in London as an analyst. In 2003 he became a banker for ABN AMRO in Moscow. In September 2004 he became the deputy chairman of the Enterprise Management Agency of Georgia. In 2005 Georgian President Mikhail Saakashvili appointed him Minister of Economic Development of Georgia.

He is married, has a wife and two children and speaks Georgian, English, French and Russian.

References 

1973 births
Living people
Politicians from Tbilisi
Government ministers of Georgia (country)